George Robert Stibitz (April 30, 1904 – January 31, 1995) was a Bell Labs researcher internationally recognized as one of the fathers of the modern digital computer. He was known for his work in the 1930s and 1940s on the realization of Boolean logic digital circuits using electromechanical relays as the switching element.

Stibitz was born in York, Pennsylvania. He received his bachelor's degree from Denison University in Granville, Ohio, his master's degree from Union College in 1927, and his Ph.D. in mathematical physics in 1930 from Cornell University.

Computer

In November 1937, George Stibitz, then working at Bell Labs (1930–1941), completed a relay-based adder he later dubbed the "Model K" (for "kitchen table", on which he had assembled it), which calculated using binary addition. Replicas of the "Model K" now reside in the Computer History Museum, the Smithsonian Institution, the William Howard Doane Library at Denison University and the American Computer Museum in Bozeman, Montana, where the George R. Stibitz Computer and Communications Pioneer Awards are granted.

Bell Labs subsequently authorized a full research program in late 1938 with Stibitz at the helm. Their Complex Number Computer, completed in November 1939 and put into operation in 1940, was able to  do calculations on complex numbers.  In a demonstration to the American Mathematical Society conference at Dartmouth College in September 1940, Stibitz used a modified teletype to send commands to the Complex Number Computer in New York over telegraph lines. It was the first computing machine ever used remotely.

Wartime activities and subsequent Bell Labs computers
After the United States entered World War II in December 1941, Bell Labs became active in developing fire-control devices for the U.S. military. The Labs' most famous invention was the M-9 Gun Director, an ingenious analog device that directed anti-aircraft fire with uncanny accuracy. Stibitz moved to the National Defense Research Committee, an advisory body for the government, but he kept close ties with Bell Labs. For the next several years (1941–1945), with his guidance, the Labs developed relay computers of ever-increasing sophistication. The first of them was used to test the M-9 Gun Director. Later models had more sophisticated capabilities. They had specialized names, but later on, Bell Labs renamed them "Model II", "Model III", etc., and the Complex Number Computer was renamed the "Model I". All used telephone relays for logic, and paper tape for sequencing and control. The "Model V", was completed in 1946 and was a fully programmable, general-purpose computer, although its relay technology made it slower than the all-electronic computers then under development.

After the war, in 1945, Stibitz did not return to Bell Labs, but instead went into private consulting work.

Use of the term "digital"
In April 1942, Stibitz attended a meeting of a division of the Office of Scientific Research and Development (OSRD), charged with evaluating various proposals for fire-control devices to be used against Axis forces during World War II. Stibitz noted that the proposals fell into two broad categories: "analog" and "pulse". In a memo written after the meeting, he suggested that the term "digital" be used in place of "pulse", as he felt the latter term was insufficiently descriptive of the nature of the processes involved.

Awards
 Harry H. Goode Memorial Award in 1965 (together with Konrad Zuse)

 IEEE's Computer Pioneer Award, 1982
 election to the National Academy of Engineering, 1981
 election to the National Inventors Hall of Fame, 1985

Stibitz held 38 patents, in addition to those he earned at Bell Labs.  He became a member of the faculty at Dartmouth College in 1964 to build bridges between the fields of computing and medicine, and retired from research in 1983.

Computer art
In his later years, Stibitz "turned to non-verbal uses of the computer". Specifically, he used a Commodore-Amiga to create computer art. In a 1990 letter, written to the department chair of the Mathematics and Computer Science department of Denison University he said:

I have turned to non-verbal uses of the computer, and have made a display of computer "art". The quotes are obligatory, for the result of my efforts is not to create important art but to show that this activity is fun, much as the creation of computers was fifty years ago.

The Mathematics and Computer Science department at Denison University has enlarged and displayed some of his artwork.

Publications
   (4 pages)
   (102 pages)

See also
 List of pioneers in computer science
 John Vincent Atanasoff
 Bell Labs
 Gray code (reflected binary code)
 Stibitz code (excess-3 code)
 Gray–Stibitz code (Gray excess-3 code)

References

Further reading
 Melina Hill, Valley News Correspondent, A Tinkerer Gets a Place in History, Valley News West Lebanon NH, Thursday March 31, 1983, page 13.
 Brian Randall, ed. The Origins of Digital Computers: Selected Papers (Berlin, Heidelberg, New York: Springer-Verlag, 1975), pp. 237–286.
 Andrew Hodges (1983), Alan Turing: The Enigma, Simon and Schuster, New York, . Stibitz is mentioned briefly on pages 299 and 326. Hodges refers to Stibitz's machine as one of two "big relay calculators" (Howard H. Aiken's being the other one, p. 326).
"The second American project [Aiken's being the first] was underway at Bell Laboratories. Here the engineer G. Stibitz had first only thought of designing relay machines to perform decimal arithmetic with complex numbers, but after the outbreak of war had incorporated the facility to carry out a fixed sequence of arithmetical operations. His 'Model III' [sic] was under way in the New York building at the time of Alan Turing's stay there, but it had not drawn his attention." (p. 299)
 Stibitz's work with binary addition has a peculiar (i.e. apparently simultaneous) overlap with some experimenting Alan Turing did in 1937 while a PhD student at Princeton. The following is according to a Dr. Malcolm McPhail "who became involved in a sideline that Alan took up" (p. 137); Turing built his own relays and "actually designed an electric multiplier and built the first three or four stages to see if it could be made to work" (p. 138). It is unknown whether Stibitz and/or McPhail had any influence on this work of Turing's; McPhail's implication is that Turing's "[alarm]about a possible war with Germany" (p. 138) caused him to become interested in cryptanalysis, and this interest led to discussions with McPhail, and these discussions led to the relay-multiplier experiments (the pertinent part of McPhail's letter to Hodges is quoted in Hodges p. 138).
 
 Smiley, Jane, The Man Who Invented the Computer: The Biography of John Atanasoff, Digital Pioneer, Random House Digital, Inc., 2010. .
 Obituary by Kip Crosby of the Computing History Association of California
 Relay computers of George Stibitz (Detailed descriptions)
 Reckoners: the Prehistory of the Digital Computer, from Relays to the Stored Program Concept, 1935–1945 (Westport CT: Greenwood Press 1983), Chapter 4 (Detailed description and history)

External links
 George R. Stibitz website at Denison University
 Home of the George R. Stibitz Computer and Communications Pioneer Awards
 Biography of Stibitz on the Pioneers website – By Kerry Redshaw, Brisbane, Australia
 The Papers of George Stibitz at Dartmouth College Library

1904 births
1995 deaths
Cornell University alumni
Denison University alumni
Union College (New York) alumni
Scientists at Bell Labs
People from York, Pennsylvania
20th-century American inventors